Karl Sollak (born 27 October 1956) is an Austrian conductor.

Life 
Born in Vienna, Sollak began his musical career with the Vienna Boys' Choir and studied horn, piano and conducting at the University of Music and Performing Arts Vienna with Hans Swarowsky.

From 1979 to 1991, he was répétiteur at the Vienna State Opera and assisted conductors such as Claudio Abbado, Lorin Maazel, Michel Plasson, Leonard Slatkin, Riccardo Muti and James Levine in recordings. As part of the opera studio of the State Opera, he conducted the Austrian premiere of Udo Zimmermann's opera  at the Künstlerhaus Wien.

He conducted concerts with the instrumentalists Nelson Freire, Barbara Moser, Itzhak Perlman and the singers Mirella Freni, Renata Scotto, Anna Netrebko, José Carreras and Plácido Domingo.

In 1999, Sollak conducted the comeback concert of tenor Franco Bonisolli at the Wiener Konzerthaus, which was followed by performances in Graz, Poznan and Vienna (Wiener Musikverein), together with Franz Grundheber. He also conducted concerts with Cheryl Studer in Wroclaw, with Luis Lima and Mara Zampieri in Paris, and with Aga Mikolaj in the US and Poland, and conducted concerts at the Vienna Musikverein. In 2004 he made his debut at the Volksoper Wien, conducting Don Giovanni and La traviata, in 2005 in Oviedo and in 2006 in Madrid.

In 1989, Sollak made his US debut with the Minnesota Orchestra. In 1993, he became principal conductor of the Puerto Rico Symphony Orchestra. In 1997, he conducted the gala concert in honour of Mayor Rudolph Giuliani (with Mirella Freni and Plácido Domingo) at the New York City Opera. In his appearances in the US and Canada, Sollak has conducted concerts in New York (David Geffen Hall), Chicago, Milwaukee, Hartford, Cleveland, Pittsburgh and Philadelphia, also with Aga Mikolaj and Jerry Hadley, as well as in Montreal, Toronto and Calgary.

Sollak conducted a dozen concerts with Plácido Domingo from 1995 onwards. In 1998, he conducted the final concert at Plácido Domingo's Operalia singing competition in Hamburg. He made his debut in Japan in June 2000, conducting Plácido Domingo's televised "Millennium Concert" in Tokyo.

Sollak conducted ballet performances at the Vienna State Opera in the 1980s,
and has appeared among others at the Washington Opera House, the Finnish National Opera and Ballet and the Tiroler Landestheater Innsbruck. His operatic repertoire includes, among others, Fidelio, Ariadne auf Naxos, L'italiana in Algeri, I Capuleti e i Montecchi, La Bohème, Tosca and Carmen. He conducted new productions of La traviata at the Washington Opera, Fidelio at Opera Ireland in Dublin. At the Státní opera Praha he conducted a new production of Don Giovanni and at the Chattanooga Opera House (US) Un ballo in maschera. At the Tenerife Opera he conducted I Capuleti e i Montecchi.

At festivals he gave guest performances at the "Prague Autumn"; the "Festival Carcassonne" in France; the "Mozart Festival" in Woodstock (Illinois), the "Hoffmann Festival" in Poznan/Poland, at festivals in Soria (Spain) and Palma de Mallorca. In 2008 Sollak opened the "Al Bustan Festival" in Beirut with two concerts and gave guest performances in Abu Dhabi, in 2008 and 2009 in Madrid. In the same year, he conducted works by Hiba Kawas, a contemporary Lebanese composer, in Beirut.

Recordings 
Sollak conducted the Münchner Rundfunkorchester for radio recordings with works by Elgar, Stravinsky and Sibelius, an aria disc with Lyuba Kazarnovskaya in Moscow and a live CD with the Four Last Songs by Richard Strauss with Aga Mikolaj and the Győr Philharmonic Orchestra. He also conducted a CD production with Plácido Domingo (Placido Domingo live in Seoul) and a live recording with Franco Bonisolli in Graz.

References

External links 
 
 
 

Austrian conductors (music)
1956 births
Living people
Musicians from Vienna